The Tree of Heaven is a collection of short stories by Robert W. Chambers, author of The King in Yellow, The Maker of Moons, and The Mystery of Choice.  Mostly set in New York with a snowy nocturnal backdrop, the stories are light and humorous romantic tales, several of which feature the weird.

Published in America by D. Appleton & Company, New York, 1907, with pictorial cloth design, and by Grosset & Dunlap, New York, 1907, with dark green cloth and pictorial paste-down.  Published in Britain by Archibald Constable & Co. Ltd, London, in 1908.

Contents
"The Carpet of Belshazzar"
"The Sign of Venus"
"The Case of Mr. Helmer"
"The Tree of Dreams"
"The Bridal Pair"
"Ex Curia"
"The Golden Pool"
"Out of the Depths"
"The Swastika"
"The Ghost of Chance"

1907 short story collections
American short story collections
D. Appleton & Company books
Grosset & Dunlap books